

17th century

18th century

19th century

20th century

21st century

See also
 Timeline of Philippine history

 
Philippines history-related lists
Philippines